NGC 880 is a spiral galaxy located in the constellation Cetus about 590 million light-years from the Milky Way. It was discovered by the American astronomer Francis Leavenworth in 1886.

See also 
 List of NGC objects (1–1000)

References

External links 
 

0880
Spiral galaxies
Cetus (constellation)
008805